HMS Southampton was a  light cruiser built for the Royal Navy in the 1910s. She was a member of the Chatham sub-class of the Town class. The ship survived the First World War and was sold for scrap in 1926.

Design and description 
The Chatham sub-class were slightly larger and improved versions of the preceding Weymouth sub-class.

The main armament of the Chathams was eight BL 6-inch Mk XI naval guns. Two of these guns were mounted on the centreline fore and aft of the superstructure and two more were mounted on the forecastle deck abreast the bridge. The remaining four guns amidships were raised to the extended forecastle deck, which meant that they could be worked in all weathers. All these guns were fitted with gun shields. Four Vickers 3-pounder (47 mm) saluting guns were also fitted. Their armament was completed by two submerged 21-inch (533 mm) torpedo tubes.

Construction and career 

Southampton was laid down on 6 April 1911 by John Brown & Company at their Clydebank shipyard and launched on 16 May 1912. Upon completion in November, the ship was assigned to the 1st Battle Squadron and she became flagship of the 1st Light Cruiser Squadron in July 1913.

The ship had an extremely active wartime career. Southampton participated in the Battle of Heligoland Bight, and later in the Battle of Dogger Bank in early 1915. In May 1916, Southampton fought in the Battle of Jutland as flagship of 2nd Light Cruiser Squadron where she torpedoed the German light cruiser , which subsequently sank. In 1917, she was transferred to the 8th Light Cruiser Squadron with whom she remained for the rest of the war.

Southampton was sold for scrapping on 13 July 1926 to Thos. W. Ward, of Pembroke Dock.

Notes

Bibliography

External links 

 Ships of the Chatham group
 A North Sea Diary 1914–1918 Account by Stephen King-Hall, an officer who served on her through the war.
Battle of Jutland Crew Lists Project - HMS Southampton Crew List

 

Town-class cruisers (1910) of the Royal Navy
Ships built in Barrow-in-Furness
1912 ships
World War I cruisers of the United Kingdom